Rev. Beniah Longley Whitman (also spelled Benaiah; November 21, 1862 – November 27, 1911) was the 11th president of Colby College, and later Columbian College (now George Washington University).

Life
Beniah Longley Whitman was born in Wilmot, Nova Scotia on November 21, 1962. He prepared for college at the Worcester Academy in Worcester, Massachusetts. He graduated from Brown University in the class of 1887, with a B.A. degree, and received an M.A. degree in 1890. He received the honorary degree of D.D. from Bowdoin College in 1894; the degree of LL.D. from Howard University in 1899, and from Furman University in 1906.

He was lecturer in Bucknell University, 1900–07; trustee of Newton Theological Institution (now the Andover Newton Theological School), 1894-02; and of the Crozer Theological Seminary, 1901–08; President of the American Baptist Historical Society, 1900–07. He was a member of the Delta Upsilon fraternity and of Phi Beta Kappa.

He married Mary J. Scott of Newton, Massachusetts on December 6, 1888, and they had four children. He was pastor of the Free Street Baptist Church, Portland, Maine, 1890–92; President of Colby College, 1892–95; President of Columbian, now George Washington University, 1895-1900; pastor of the Fifth Baptist Church, Philadelphia, Pennsylvania, 1900–07; First Baptist Church, Seattle, Washington, from 1908 until his death in 1911.

Publications
Ideals in Education (1892)
Elements of Ethics (1893)
Elements of Sociology (1894)
Elements of Political Science (1899)
Outlines of Political History (1900)

References

External links
 Rev. Beniah Longley Whitman at Colby College

1862 births
1911 deaths
Brown University alumni
Howard University alumni
Furman University alumni
George Washington University faculty
Canadian academics
People from Annapolis County, Nova Scotia
Presidents of Colby College
Canadian emigrants to the United States
Presidents of George Washington University